Scott John Williams (born 7 August 1974) is a Welsh former professional footballer who played as a left-back. He made appearances for Wrexham in the English Football League.

He also played non-league football for Congleton Town and Leek Town, making 70 appearances for the latter. He also played in the Welsh league for Airbus UK Broughton.

References

1974 births
Living people
Welsh footballers
Footballers from Bangor, Gwynedd
Association football defenders
Wrexham A.F.C. players
Congleton Town F.C. players
Leek Town F.C. players
Airbus UK Broughton F.C. players
English Football League players